Wainiha is a community section in the Hanalei district of northern Kauai. It had a total population of 419 at the 2020 census.

Geography
Wainiha is on the northern coast of Kauai and includes a bay and canal. The terrain is varied and also includes a cliff (pali), river, and valley. Wainiha is 25.49 square miles. The Lumaha'i River enters the sea just to the east at Lumahai Beach.

Community demographics
According to the 2010 census, Wainiha is home to 318 people. The population density is 14 people per square mile. The median household income is $53,097.

Etymology
The name is Hawaiian and literally translates to "unfriendly water", probably referring to the coastline's treacherous currents.

References

Unincorporated communities in Kauai County, Hawaii
Unincorporated communities in Hawaii